Events in the year 1994 in Namibia.

Incumbents 

 President: Sam Nujoma
 Prime Minister: Hage Geingob
 Chief Justice of Namibia: Ismael Mahomed

Events 

 4 & 5 December – General elections were held in the country.

Deaths

References 

 
1990s in Namibia
Years of the 20th century in Namibia
Namibia
Namibia